William Collins House may refer to:

William Collins House (Fall River, Massachusetts), listed on the National Register of Historic Places (NRHP)
 William Collins House (Madison, Wisconsin), NRHP-listed

See also
Collins House (disambiguation)